Major General Shukhrat Gairatzhonovich Kholmukhammedov is the current Chief of the General Staff of the Armed Forces of Uzbekistan, having been appointed to this position on 23 March 2021. He was also awarded the rank of Major General at the same time.

Prior to his appointment, he served as Deputy Defense Minister, Deputy Secretary of the Presidential Security Council and Deputy Minister of Emergency Situations.

In 2016 he was awarded the Sodi Khizmatlari Uchun medal.

References 

Chiefs of the General Staff (Uzbekistan)
Living people
Year of birth missing (living people)